Federico Julián Fazio (born 17 March 1987) is an Argentine professional footballer who plays as a central defender for Italian club Salernitana.

He began his career at Ferro Carril Oeste, signing for Sevilla in 2007. He made 201 official appearances for the latter club in nine years and scored 15 goals, joining Tottenham Hotspur in August 2014 and subsequently returning to Sevilla on loan; in August 2016, he moved to the Italian Serie A with Roma.

Fazio made his debut for Argentina in 2011, and represented the country at the 2018 World Cup.

Club career

Sevilla
Born in Buenos Aires, Fazio started his career in the Primera Nacional with Ferro Carril Oeste in 2005. He was bought by Spanish club Sevilla FC in late January 2007 and spent the vast majority of the remaining season with the reserves, which he helped achieve promotion to Segunda División.

Fazio started 2007–08 registered with both Sevilla teams. However, due to the absences of Javi Navarro (knee, entire campaign missed) and Julien Escudé (pubis, less than half of possible games), he ended up playing an important part on a side that reached a final qualification for the UEFA Cup. His first game with the main squad was on 25 August 2007 in the season opener, a 4–1 home La Liga win against Getafe CF.

On 7 May 2008, Fazio scored his first goal for Sevilla in a 3–0 win at Racing de Santander. He added another in that match, and a third a week later in a 2–0 home victory over Real Betis; in both games, he played as a defensive midfielder.

In his second year, they finished third but Fazio featured slightly less and saw time at both positions. He was mostly injured during the following season, making only ten league appearances (on 13 March 2010, he headed home in a 1–1 home draw against Deportivo de La Coruña). The Andalusians ended the league in the fourth place, also winning the Copa del Rey, but he was not picked for the final of the latter competition itself.

Still bothered with some physical problems in 2010–11, Fazio played the most he had in years, appearing in 19 games – 17 starts – as Sevilla ranked fifth and qualified for the Europa League.

Tottenham
Fazio signed for Tottenham Hotspur on 26 August 2014 for a fee of £8 million, on a four-year contract. On 18 October he started on his Premier League debut at Manchester City, but was given a straight red card for denying Sergio Agüero a goalscoring opportunity in the penalty area, in an eventual 4–1 defeat. On 6 November he met the same fate, after conceding a penalty with a foul on Jerónimo Barrales in the closing stages of a 2–1 away win over Asteras Tripolis F.C. in the Europa League group stage.

Sevilla return
On 31 January 2016, after only one competitive game in the first part of the season (a 1–2 home loss to Arsenal in the League Cup) Fazio returned to Sevilla on a five-month loan. He was sent off after just 24 minutes on his debut for two bookable offences, in a 1–1 away draw with RC Celta de Vigo.

The decision to hand Fazio the number 16 shirt was controversial, as convention had previously been for only homegrown players to wear the number that Antonio Puerta wore when he died playing for the team in 2007.

Roma
On 3 August 2016, Fazio was loaned to A.S. Roma, with the Italians having the possibility of buying outright at the end of the campaign for €3.2 million. He made his Serie A debut 17 days later, playing ten minutes in a 4–0 home win against Udinese Calcio. A permanent deal was agreed on 15 July 2017.

Fazio tested positive for COVID-19 in November 2020. After the arrival of new manager José Mourinho, he did not receive any playing time and was ultimately made to train on his own; as a result, he took legal action against the club.

Salernitana
On 29 January 2022, shortly after initially rejecting an offer, Fazio signed a 2.5-year contract with U.S. Salernitana 1919.

International career
Fazio was an integral part of the Argentina under-20 team that won the FIFA World Cup in 2007. The following year, he helped the Olympic team win gold at the Summer Olympics in Beijing: he played twice in the tournament, as backup for Nicolás Pareja and Ezequiel Garay.

On 1 June 2011, Fazio made his debut for the full side, appearing in a 4–1 friendly defeat in Nigeria. He scored his first goal for his country in another exhibition game, opening an eventual 6–0 win in Singapore on 13 June 2017.

Fazio was selected by manager Jorge Sampaoli for his 2018 FIFA World Cup squad. He made his debut in the competition on 30 June, coming on as a 46th-minute substitute for Marcos Rojo in a 4–3 round-of-16 loss against France.

Career statistics

Club

International

Argentina score listed first, score column indicates score after each Fazio goal.

Honours
Sevilla B
Segunda División B: 2006–07

Sevilla
Copa del Rey: 2009–10
Supercopa de España: 2007
UEFA Europa League: 2013–14

Tottenham Hotspur
Football League Cup runner-up: 2014–15

Argentina U20
FIFA U-20 World Cup: 2007

Argentina U23
Summer Olympics: 2008

References

External links

1987 births
Living people
Argentine people of Italian descent
Argentine people of Sicilian descent
Argentine footballers
Footballers from Buenos Aires
Association football defenders
Association football midfielders
Primera Nacional players
Ferro Carril Oeste footballers
La Liga players
Segunda División players
Segunda División B players
Sevilla Atlético players
Sevilla FC players
Premier League players
Tottenham Hotspur F.C. players
Serie A players
A.S. Roma players
U.S. Salernitana 1919 players
UEFA Europa League winning players
Argentina under-20 international footballers
Argentina international footballers
2018 FIFA World Cup players
Olympic footballers of Argentina
Footballers at the 2008 Summer Olympics
Olympic medalists in football
Medalists at the 2008 Summer Olympics
Olympic gold medalists for Argentina
Argentine expatriate footballers
Expatriate footballers in Spain
Expatriate footballers in England
Expatriate footballers in Italy
Argentine expatriate sportspeople in Spain
Argentine expatriate sportspeople in England
Argentine expatriate sportspeople in Italy